Movado is an American luxury watchmaker. It is best known for its Museum Watch. Movado means "movement" in Esperanto. The watches are known for their signature metallic dot at 12 o'clock and minimalist style. Movado traces its origins to La Chaux-de-Fonds, Switzerland.

History 
The company was founded by Achille Ditesheim in 1881 in the watch-making town of La Chaux-de-Fonds. The Ditesheim family, a Jewish watchmaker family, owned several companies in the area. 

In 1892, the brothers Leopold, Achille, and Isidore combined their separate businesses to create "L.A. & I. Ditesheim, Fabricants". This was one of the first modern factories in the area following the watchmaking crisis of the 1870s. Having arrived over the course of the century, many Jewish traders, craftsmen and entrepreneurs were less attached to traditional working models, and thus played a major role in innovating the Swiss watch industry.

Within 20 years, the company had more than 80 employees and was internationally known for its wide variety of pocket watches. Movado began to produce wristwatches, and the company expanded again in 1905, now employing more than 150 workers. It was at this time that it was renamed Movado, which means "always in motion" in Esperanto.

In 1983, the company was purchased by North American Watch Corp, founded by Gedalio Grinberg, a Cuban-born Jew, who fled Fidel Castro's Marxist Revolution in 1960 with his family.

His son, Efraim Grinberg, is the chairman and chief executive officer of Movado Group, Inc. The North American President of Movado is Alan Chinich.

On February 23, 1999, Movado Group, Inc. completed the sale of Piaget business to VLG North America, Inc., for approximately $30 million. In August 2018, Movado acquired watch startup MVMT, which was founded in 2013, for more than $100 million.

Watches

Museum Watch 
The company markets the Museum Watch, designed by the American designer Nathan George Horwitt in 1947.
Influenced by Bauhaus, the watch dial has a very simple design defined by a solitary dot at 12, symbolizing the sun at high noon. It was first made by an American importer of Swiss watches called "Vacheron & Constantin-LeCoultre Watches Inc." (not the Swiss watchmaker Vacheron Constantin), and later produced by Movado. Horwitt's dial was selected for the permanent design collection of the Museum of Modern Art, New York, in 1960, the first watch dial awarded this distinction. Movado finally settled with Horwitt in 1975 with a payment of $29,000 ($128,000 in 2015 dollars). Following Horwitt's death, Movado started heavy promotion of Horwitt and the design of the Museum Watch. Photographer Edward Steichen called Horwitt's design "the only truly original and beautiful one for such an object". The single dot dial now appears in many of Movado's timepieces.

Other Watches 

Some Movado watch models have names in Esperanto, a constructed language, such as Bela ("beautiful"), Belamodo ("beautiful fashion"), Fiero ("pride"), Brila ("brilliant"), Linio ("line"), and Verto ("head top").

In November 2015, Movado announced the release of the Movado Motion collection of fine Swiss-made watches, powered by the Manufacture Modules Technologies (MMT) MotionX technology platform. The collection includes the women's Bellina and the men's Museum Sport models.

Brands 
Movado Group's brands include Movado, Concord, EBEL, Olivia Burton and MVMT, plus licensed brands Coach, Hugo Boss, Lacoste, Tommy Hilfiger and Calvin Klein. Movado previously manufactured other licensed brands, plus previously owned Piaget.

Sculpture 
Movado commissioned Time Sculpture by architect Philip Johnson. The bronze sculpture with granite base, located outside Lincoln Center in New York City, was dedicated on May 19, 1999.

See also
Movado Ermeto watch

References

External links
Official Site
G Grinberg's Obituary in the New York Times

Companies listed on the New York Stock Exchange
Manufacturing companies established in 1881
Swiss watch brands
Watch manufacturing companies of the United States
Manufacturing companies based in New Jersey
Swiss companies established in 1881